Sylvain Moukassa (born 21 April 1973) is a Congolese footballer. He played in 19 matches for the Congo national football team from 1992 to 2004. He was also named in Congo's squad for the 1992 African Cup of Nations tournament.

References

1973 births
Living people
Republic of the Congo footballers
Republic of the Congo international footballers
1992 African Cup of Nations players
Place of birth missing (living people)
Association football midfielders
Sportspeople from Brazzaville